Spilomantis is a genus of Asian praying mantids in the family Iridopterygidae.  These species were long placed in the genus Hapalopeza, but after a review of type material at the Natural History Museum, London this genus name has been restored.

Species 
The Mantodea Species File lists:
 Spilomantis nigripes Werner, 1926
 Spilomantis occipitalis (Westwood, 1889) – type species (as Hapalopeza occipitalis Westwood)

References

External links 
 

Iridopteryginae
Mantodea genera
Insects of Southeast Asia